Take the "A" Train is a 1956 album by the American jazz singer Betty Roché. It was Roché's debut album. Take the "A" Train was reissued on CD in 2000, with two alternate takes of "Go Away Blues".

Reception
Scott Yanow reviewed the album for AllMusic and wrote that the album was Roché's "definitive session" and that "Roché is heard at her best on this set of standards", concluding that it was an "excellent release".

Track listing
 "Take the "A" Train" (Billy Strayhorn) – 3:13
 "Something to Live For" (Duke Ellington, Strayhorn) – 4:04
 "In a Mellow Tone" (Ellington, Milt Gabler) – 2:29
 "Time After Time" (Sammy Cahn, Jule Styne) – 3:05
 "Go Away Blues" (Ellington) – 3:18
 "Can't Help Lovin' Dat Man" (Oscar Hammerstein II, Jerome Kern) – 3:42
 "Route 66" (Bobby Troup) – 4:34
 "All My Life" (Harry Akst, Benny Davis) – 3:48
 "I Just Got the Message, Baby" – 2:39
 "All Too Soon" (Ellington, Carl Sigman) – 4:07
 "You Don't Love Me No More" (Ellington) – 3:17
 "September in the Rain" (Al Dubin, Harry Warren) – 3:50

Personnel
Betty Roché – vocals
Conte Candoli – trumpet
Donn Trenner – piano
Eddie Costa – vibraphone
Whitey Mitchell – double bass
David Williams – drums
Leonard Feather – liner notes
Burt Goldblatt – cover art
Rick Essig, Frank Abbey, John Cue – engineer
Lyn Bradley – reissue package design
Tom Moulton – remastering

References

1956 debut albums
Bethlehem Records albums
Betty Roché albums